Koinawa is a village on Abaiang atoll in Kiribati. There are 312 residents of the village (2010 census).  It is located to the south of Aonobuaka; to its east is Morikao.

The village has a medical clinic that is staffed by a Nursing Officer and the clinic is accessed by resident of the Koinawa and Aonobuaka community.

The lagoon coastline of Koinawa is eroding as the result of wave action.

Religion

Churches
Our Lady of the Rosary Church, Koinawa

References

Populated places in Kiribati